The Portugal national football team has represented Portugal in international men's football competition since 1921. The national team is controlled by the Portuguese Football Federation (FPF), the governing body for football in Portugal. Portugal's home matches are played at various stadiums throughout Portugal, and its primary training ground and technical headquarters, Cidade do Futebol, is located in Oeiras. The head coach of the team is Roberto Martínez, who replaced Fernando Santos in January 2023 following his stepping down after the 2022 World Cup, and the captain is Cristiano Ronaldo, who also holds the team records for most caps and most goals.

Portugal's first participation in a major tournament finals was at the 1966 World Cup, which saw a team featuring Ballon d'Or winner Eusébio finish in third place. Portugal also made it to the semi-finals of the UEFA Euro 1984, losing to hosts and eventual winners France. Under the team's first golden generation in the 1990s, Portugal began consistently featuring in the European Championship and World Cup; they made the semi-finals of the 2006 World Cup, finishing in fourth place, along with placing as runners-up at Euro 2004 as hosts, and reaching the semi-finals of Euro 2000 and Euro 2012. This was in great part due to the production of several players, such as Luís Figo, Rui Costa, Ricardo Carvalho, and Cristiano Ronaldo, who is regarded as one of the greatest players of all time.

In 2014, Fernando Santos was appointed as the new head coach for the national team. Two years later at Euro 2016, Santos led Portugal to its first-ever major trophy, defeating hosts France in the final. With the win, Portugal qualified and made its only appearance in the FIFA Confederations Cup held in Russia, where they finished in third place. Portugal qualified for and hosted the brand new 2019 Nations League finals where they triumphed, defeating the Netherlands and earning their second major tournament victory in three finals.

Portugal is colloquially referred to as the Seleção das Quinas (a synecdoche based on the flag of the country) and has notable rivalries with Brazil, due to shared cultural traits and heritage, France, due to several important meetings between the two teams at Euro and World Cup, and Spain, known as A Guerra Ibérica in Portuguese or The Iberian War in English, with the rivalry between two countries going back to 1581.

History

Early World Cup attempts
Portugal was not invited to the 1930 World Cup, which only featured a final stage and no qualification round. The team took part in the 1934 FIFA World Cup qualification, but failed to eliminate their Spanish opponents, aggregating two defeats in the two-legged round, with a 9–0 loss in Madrid and 2–1 loss in Lisbon for an aggregate score of 11–1.

In the 1938 FIFA World Cup qualification, the Seleção played one game against Syria held in neutral ground in Milan. They lost 2–1 and failed to qualify for the finals. The Second World War delayed the World Cup until 1950 and subsequently, the national team rarely played. A 10–0 home friendly loss against England, two years after the war, still stands as their biggest ever defeat.

1950s and early 1960s
Similar to 1934, Portugal were to play a two-legged round against Spain. After a 5–1 defeat in Madrid, they managed to draw in the second game 2–2. With a 7–3 aggregate score, they did not qualify on the pitch, however they would later be invited to replace Turkey, which had withdrawn from participating. Portugal refused to participate.

For the qualification of the 1954 World Cup, the team would play Austria; the Austrians won the first game with a 9–1 result. The best the Portuguese could do was hold the Austrians to a goalless draw in Lisbon, resulting in a 9–1 aggregate defeat. In the 1958 World Cup qualification, Portugal won a qualifying match for the first time, a 3–0 home victory over Italy. Nevertheless, they finished last in a group that also featured Northern Ireland; only the first-placed team, Northern Ireland, would qualify.

1960 was the year that UEFA created the European Championship. The first edition was a knock-out tournament, the last four teams participating in the final stage that only featured one leg while the earlier stages had two legs. In the first round, the Seleção das Quinas won 2–0 at East Germany and then 3–2 in Porto, advancing with a 5–2 two-legged win. The quarter-final opponent was Yugoslavia, who won 6–3 on aggregate.

England and Luxembourg were the 1962 FIFA World Cup qualification adversaries of the national team. Portugal ended second in the group, behind England. Only the top team would qualify. In the 1964 European Championship, Portugal played against Bulgaria in the qualifying rounds. The Portuguese lost in Sofia and won in Lisbon. With the round tied 4–4, a replay was needed in a neutral country. In the Stadio Olimpico in Rome, Portugal lost 1–0 thanks to a late strike from Georgi Asparuhov.

1966 World Cup and 1970s
In the 1966 World Cup qualification, Portugal was drawn into the same group as Czechoslovakia, Romania and Turkey. They topped the group with only one draw and one defeat during all the six games and finally qualified for a FIFA World Cup, that year the final stage would be held in England. Notable results were both 1–0 away wins against Czechoslovakia and Turkey and a 5–1 home win against the Turks.

The team started out with three wins in the group stage where they were in Group C when they beat Hungary 3–1, Bulgaria 3–0, and two-time defending champions Brazil 3–1. Secondly, they beat surprise quarter-finalist North Korea 5–3, with Eusébio getting four markers to overturn a 3–0 deficit. Later, they reached the semi-finals where they were beaten by hosts England 2–1; in this game, Portugal would have played in Liverpool, but as England were the hosts, FIFA decided that the game should have been in the English capital, which led the Portuguese team travel unexpectedly from Liverpool to London. Portugal then defeated the Soviet Union 2–1 in the third place match for their best World Cup finish to date. Eusébio was the top scorer of the World Cup with nine goals.

In the Euro 1972 qualifiers, Portugal finished second in a group that comprised the teams of Belgium, Denmark and Scotland to advance to the finals.

For the 1974 World Cup qualification stages, Portugal were unable to defeat Bulgaria (drawing 2–2) in the decisive match, and thus failed to qualify. Portugal faced tough competition from Poland for the place in the 1978 World Cup in Argentina, and finished in second place behind the Poles.

Late 1970s, 1980s and early 1990s
Portugal was put alongside Austria, Belgium, Norway and Scotland to fight for the first spot in the group, which would allow them to go to the final stage of UEFA Euro 1980; they finished third.

For the 1982 qualification, the Portuguese team faced Israel, Northern Ireland, Scotland and Sweden, finishing fourth and failing to qualify.

During the qualifying campaign for Euro 1984, Portugal was grouped with Finland, Poland and the Soviet Union. Portugal won the group with a win over the Soviet Union, which allowed them to qualify and be placed in Group B alongside Spain, West Germany and Romania. In the first two matches, they tied 0–0 and 1–1 against West Germany and Spain, respectively. A 1–0 win over Romania gave them second place in the group, to go through to the knockout stage, where they were matched against the hosts, France. The game was tied after 90 minutes and went into extra time; Portugal made the score 2–1, but France scored in the 114th and 119th minutes to eliminate Portugal 3–2 and go through to the final.

For the 1986 tournament, the Seleção played against Czechoslovakia, Malta, Sweden and West Germany for the two spots that would guarantee them a ticket to Mexico. Needing a win in the last game against West Germany in Stuttgart, Portugal won the game to become the first team to beat West Germany at their home ground in an official match. The team exited early in the group stages after a win and two losses. They started with a 1–0 win to England, but later were beaten by Poland and Morocco 1–0 and 3–1 respectively. Their staying in Mexico was marked by the Saltillo Affair, where players refused to train in order to win more prizes from the Portuguese Football Federation.

For the UEFA Euro 1988 the Portuguese team attempted to top their qualifying group in a group with Italy, Malta, Sweden and Switzerland; however, they finished third. The 1990 World Cup qualification was in a group along with Belgium, Czechoslovakia, Luxembourg and Switzerland, Portugal fought to get one of the first two spots of the group; playing at home against Czechoslovakia, the game ended 0–0 allowing the Central Europeans to get the second place.

During Euro 1992 qualifying, the Netherlands, Greece, Finland and Malta were the Portuguese opponents; Portugal ended second behind the Dutch.

For the 1994 World Cup qualification, Portugal ended third in a group with Estonia, Italy, Malta, Scotland and Switzerland, failing to qualify.

1995 to 2006: The golden generation
At UEFA Euro 1996, Portugal finished first in Group D, and in the quarter-finals, they lost 1–0 to the Czech Republic.

Portugal failed to qualify for the 1998 FIFA World Cup. In Euro 2000 qualifying, Portugal finished second in their group, one point short of first-placed Romania. However, after finishing as the top runner-up nation in qualifying, Portugal nonetheless secured passage to the tournament final stage. They then defeated England 3–2, Romania 1–0 and Germany 3–0 to finish first in Group A, then defeated Turkey in the quarter-finals. In the semi-final against France, Portugal were eliminated in extra time when Zinedine Zidane converted a penalty. Referee Günter Benkö awarded the spot kick for a handball after Abel Xavier blocked a shot. Xavier, Nuno Gomes and Paulo Bento were all given lengthy suspensions for subsequently shoving the referee. The final result was 2–1.

During 2002 FIFA World Cup qualifying, Portugal won the group. Several problems and poor judgement decisions occurred during the preparation and tournament itself – shopping sprees by players were widely reported in the Portuguese press. Questionable managing choices and some amateurism, including the same lack of agreement on prizes. Portugal entered the tournament as favourites to win Group D. However, they were upset 3–2 by the United States. They then rebounded with a 4–0 smashing of Poland. Needing a draw to advance, they lost the final group game to hosts South Korea. Portugal underachieved and ended third in its group stage, subsequently eliminated. Manager António Oliveira was fired after the World Cup.

The next major competition, the UEFA Euro 2004, was held in Portugal. On the preparation, the Football Federation made a contract with Luiz Felipe Scolari to manage the team until the tournament ended. The Portuguese team entered the tournament being a favourite to win it.
The host nation lost the first game against Greece 1–2. They got their first win against Russia 2–0 and also beat Spain 1–0. They went on to play against England, in a 2–2 draw that went into penalties, with Portugal winning. Portugal beat the Netherlands 2–1 in the semi-final. They were beaten by Greece 1–0 in the final.

After the tournament ended, a lot of players belonging to the Geração de Ouro (Golden Generation), abandoned their international footballing careers, with only Luís Figo remaining in the team, despite a temporary retirement.

The silver lining for Portugal was the emergence of Cristiano Ronaldo. Ronaldo was selected in the UEFA Euro All Stars Team. While Portugal was playing in the competition, Scolari agreed in a new two-year deal with the Federation.

Portugal finished first in the qualifying round for the 2006 World Cup. 
Portugal finished first place in Group D of the World Cup, with victories over Angola (1–0), Iran (2–0) and Mexico (2–1).
Portugal defeated the Netherlands 1–0 in the Round of 16 in Nuremberg in an acrimonious match marked by 16 yellow cards, with four players sent off. Portugal drew 0–0 after extra-time with England, but won 3–1 on penalties to reach their first World Cup semi-final since 1966. Portugal lost 1–0 against France in the semi-finals. Portugal faced Germany in the third place play-off match in a 3–1 defeat.

Ultimately, the team won the "Most Entertaining Team" award for their play during the World Cup. Once again Scolari was asked to accept a new deal with the Federation that would maintain with as the manager until the end of the next competition.

2006 to 2014: Post-golden generation and mixed results
For Euro 2008 Portugal finished second in qualification behind Poland, and won their first two group games against Turkey and the Czech Republic, although a loss to co-hosts Switzerland set up a quarter-final matchup with Germany which the team lost 3–2. After the tournament, Scolari left to take over at Chelsea. Afterwards, Carlos Queiroz was appointed as the head coach of the Portugal national team.

Portugal came second in the qualifying stages for the 2010 FIFA World Cup under Carlos Queiroz, then beat Bosnia and Herzegovina in a play-off, thereby reaching every tournament in the decade. A 19-match undefeated streak, in which the team conceded only three goals, ended with a loss to eventual champions Spain in the round of 16, 1–0. Queiroz was later criticized for setting up his team in an overly cautious way. After the World Cup, squad regulars Simão, Paulo Ferreira, Miguel and Tiago all retired from international football. Queiroz was banned from coaching the national team for one month after he tried to block a doping test to the team while preparing for the World Cup, as well as directing insulting words to the testers. In consequence, he received a further six-month suspension. Several media outbursts from Queiroz against the heads of the Portuguese Football Federation followed, which partly prompted his dismissal. Paulo Bento was appointed as his replacement at head coach.

Bento's team qualified for Euro 2012, They were drawn with Germany, Denmark, and the Netherlands in a widely speculated "group of death". They lost their first game 0–1 to Germany, then beat Denmark 3–2. The final group stage match was against the Netherlands. After Van der Vaart had given the Dutch a 1–0 lead, Ronaldo netted twice to ensure a 2–1 victory. Portugal finished second in the group and qualified for the knockout phase. Portugal defeated the Czech Republic 1–0 in the quarter-finals with a header from Ronaldo. The semi-final match was against Spain. The game ended 0–0 and Portugal lost 4–2 on penalties.

In 2014 FIFA World Cup qualifying, Portugal won 4–2 on aggregate in a play-off against Sweden with all four goals being scored by Ronaldo, and was drawn into Group G with the United States, Germany and Ghana. Their first match against the Germans was their worst-ever defeat in a World Cup, a 4–0 loss. They went on to draw 2–2 against the United States and won 2–1 against Ghana. However, the team were eliminated due to inferior goal difference to the Americans.

2014–present: Euro 2016 and first international glories

Portugal began the Euro 2016 qualifiers with a 0–1 home defeat against Albania, which resulted in Bento being dismissed from his managerial post to be replaced by Fernando Santos in September 2014. Under Santos, the team qualified as group winners and were drawn in Group F alongside newcomers Iceland, Austria and Hungary; the Portuguese advanced into the knockout stage as the third-best third place team following three straight draws. Portugal beat Croatia 1–0 in the Round of 16 after a goal from Ricardo Quaresma in extra time and then defeated Poland 5–3 on penalties to reach the semi-finals, where they defeated Wales 2–0 in regulation time with goals from Ronaldo and Nani to reach the final at the Stade de France against hosts France. The early stages of the final saw Ronaldo limp off the pitch injured; in extra time, substitute Eder turned hero when he scored the match's only goal in the 109th minute, defying all odds. Ronaldo won the Silver Boot, scoring three goals and providing three assists.

Following their Euro 2016 victory, Portugal participated in the 2017 FIFA Confederations Cup. Portugal faced Mexico on 17 June in their opening match, which ended in a 2–2 draw. Three days later, Portugal faced hosts Russia 1–0 winning effort, with the only goal of the match being scored by Cristiano Ronaldo. On 24 June, Portugal defeated New Zealand 4–0 to top their group and advance to the semi-finals of the competition. Ronaldo was also man of the match in all three of Portugal's group stage matches. Portugal lost to Chile on penalties after a goalless draw in the semi-finals, but rebounded in the third place game, defeating Mexico 2–1 after extra time.

In the 2018 FIFA World Cup preliminary draw, Portugal were placed in Group B along with Switzerland, Hungary, Faroe Islands, Andorra and Latvia. Portugal would only lose one match against Switzerland 2–0. However, Portugal got their revenge on their last group stage match defeating Switzerland 2–0, to top their group and qualify for the 2018 World Cup.

In the 2018 FIFA World Cup, Portugal were drawn into Group B with Spain, Morocco and Iran. In their opening match on 15 June, Portugal were against Spain, which ended in a 3–3 draw, with Cristiano Ronaldo scoring a hat-trick. Ronaldo scored the only goal in a 1–0 victory against Morocco, breaking Puskás' record. Portugal faced Iran on 25 June, in their final group match, which ended in a 1–1 draw, leading Portugal to progress to the knockout round as group runners-up behind Spain. On 30 June, Portugal were eliminated following a 2–1 defeat to Uruguay in the round of 16.

Following the World Cup, Portugal was part of the inaugural UEFA Nations League, were the Seleção were placed in league A and were drawn into Group 3 with Italy and Poland. On 9 March 2018, UEFA announced that Portugal had expressed interest in bidding for the Nations League finals, which was later announced that the group winners would be appointed as the host. Portugal started the league defeating Italy in a home 1–0 victory, with André Silva scoring the match's only goal. In their second match, Portugal defeated Poland in a 3–2 away victory. In the two remaining matches, Portugal faced Italy and Poland in a 0–0 away draw and Poland 1–1 home, respectively, to advance to the Nations League finals, thereby automatically winning hosting rights, which were confirmed by the UEFA Executive Committee on 3 December 2018. In the semi-finals on 5 June 2019, Cristiano Ronaldo made his return to the team scoring a hat-trick against Switzerland to secure the hosts a spot in the final. Four days later, in the finals at the Estádio do Dragão in Porto, Portugal defeated the Netherlands 1–0, with the only being scored by Gonçalo Guedes in the 60th minute.

Portugal was drawn in Group B for the UEFA Euro 2020 qualifying with Lithuania, Luxembourg, Ukraine, and Serbia. Portugal won five games, drew two and lost one to qualify for the final tournament from the second place. In the process, Fernando Santos overtook Luiz Felipe Scolari's record as Portugal's coach with the most victories overall. Santos' team was drawn with France, Germany and Hungary in a widely speculated "group of death". Portugal advanced to the next round by defeating Hungary, drawing with France and losing to Germany. There, they faced Belgium and lost 0–1, finishing 13th overall, which is Portugal's lowest placement in Euros history.

Portugal was drawn into Group A of the 2022 FIFA World Cup qualifiers with Azerbaijan, Luxembourg, Republic of Ireland, and Serbia. After losing to Serbia at home on the final matchday, Portugal finished second and advanced to the playoffs as opposed to qualifying directly. On 24 March 2022, Portugal beat Turkey 3–1 in the playoff semi-final, and five days later they defeated North Macedonia 2–0 in the playoff final to secure a berth in the 2022 FIFA World Cup.

At the 2022 World Cup, Portugal defeated Ghana 3–2 in their first group game and then beat Uruguay 2–0  to qualify for the knockout stages. After losing 2–1 to South Korea, the Portuguese would eventually demolish Switzerland 6–1 in the round of 16. Portugal would then lose to Morocco 1–0 in the quarter finals, making the Atlas Lions the first African semi-finalists at the World Cup.

Team image

Kits

Portugal's traditional home kit is mainly red with a green trim, reflecting the colors of the nation's flag. Over the years, the particular shade of red has alternated between a darker burgundy and a lighter scarlet. Both green and red shorts have been used to complete the strip.

The team's away kits, on the other hand, have varied more considerably. White has typically been preferred as a dominant color, either with blue shorts, or red and green highlights. In recent times, all-black has been utilized, as has a turquoise-teal color, the latter of which was prominently featured during the title-winning Euro 2016 campaign.

Media coverage
Portugal's qualifying, Nations League and friendly matches are broadcast by free-to-air public broadcaster RTP and pay-TV network Sport TV.

Coaching staff

Coaching history

Results and fixtures

The following is a list of match results from the previous 12 months, as well as any future matches that have been scheduled.

2022

2023

Players

Current squad
The following 26 players were called up for UEFA Euro 2024 qualifying matches against Liechtenstein and Luxembourg on 23 and 26 March 2023, respectively.
 Caps and goals correct as of: 10 December 2022, after the match against Morocco

Recent call-ups

The following players have also been called up to the Portugal squad within the last 12 months.

COV Player withdrew from the squad due to contracting COVID-19.
INJ Player withdrew from the squad due to an injury.
PRE Preliminary squad.
RET Player retired from international football.
OTH Player withdrew from the squad due to other reasons.

Individual records

Most capped players

Players in bold are still active with Portugal.

Top goalscorers

Players in bold are still active for the national team.

Goal records
Most goals scored in one World Cup  9 – Eusébio (1966)
Most goals scored in World Cups  9 – Eusébio (1966)
Most goals scored in one European Championship  5 – Cristiano Ronaldo (2020)
Most goals scored in European Championships  14 – Cristiano Ronaldo (2004, 2008, 2012, 2016 and 2020)
Oldest goalscorer 39 years, 9 months and 10 days – Pepe (6–1 against Switzerland on 6 December 2022)
Youngest goalscorer 17 years, 9 months and 25 days – Fernando Chalana (2–1 against Cyprus on 5 December 1976)
Most hat-tricks 10 – Cristiano Ronaldo (includes four goals against Andorra on 7 October 2016 and Lithuania on 10 September 2019)
Most pokers 2 – Cristiano Ronaldo
Youngest player to score a hat-trick 20 years, 11 months and 4 days – André Silva (6–0 against Faroe Islands on 10 October 2016)

Other records
Most matches played in World Cup  22 – Cristiano Ronaldo (2006, 2010, 2014, 2018 and 2022)
Most matches played in European Championship  25 – Cristiano Ronaldo (2004, 2008, 2012, 2016 and 2020)
Oldest player (outfield and goalkeeper) 39 years, 9 months and 14 days – Pepe (0–1 against Morocco on 10 December 2022) 
Longest national career 19 years, 3 months and 20 days  – Cristiano Ronaldo (from 20 August 2003 to 10 December 2022) 
Longest national career for an outfield player 19 years, 3 months and 20 days  – Cristiano Ronaldo (from 20 August 2003 to 10 December 2022) 
Youngest debutant 17 years, 6 months and 24 days – Paulo Futre (5–0 against Finland on 21 September 1983)
Youngest player to reach 100 caps 27 years, 8 months and 11 days – Cristiano Ronaldo (1–1 against Northern Ireland on 16 October 2012)

Competitive record

 Champions   Runners-up   Third place   Fourth place

FIFA World Cup

*Draws include knockout matches decided via penalty shoot-out.

UEFA European Championship

*Draws include knockout matches decided via penalty shoot-out. Red border colour indicates that the tournament was held on home soil.

UEFA Nations League

*Draws include knockout matches decided via penalty shoot-out.
**Group stage played home and away. Flag shown represents host nation for the finals stage. Red border colour indicates the finals stage will be held on home soil

FIFA Confederations Cup

*Draws include knockout matches decided via penalty shoot-out.

Olympics Games

From 1968–1988 Portugal was represented by the national amateur football team. Football at the Summer Olympics has been an under-23 tournament since 1992.

*Draws include knockout matches decided via penalty shoot-out.

Minor tournaments

*Draws include knockout matches decided via penalty shoot-out.

All-time results

The following table shows Portugal's all-time international record, correct as of 29 March 2022.

Source: Portugal - Historical results

Honours

Major:
FIFA World Cup
Third place: 1966
Fourth place: 2006
UEFA European Championship
Winners: 2016
Runners-up: 2004
UEFA Nations League
Winners: 2018–19
FIFA Confederations Cup
Third place: 2017

Minor:
SkyDome Cup
Winners: 1995
Brazil Independence Cup
Runners-up: 1972

Other:
FIFA World Cup Most Entertaining Team: 2006
Laureus World Sports Award for Team of the Year:
Nominations: 2017

Rivalries
 Portugal–Spain football rivalry
 France–Portugal football rivalry

Footnotes

See also

* List of national sport teams of Portugal

References

External links

Portuguese Football Federation official website 
UEFA profile
FIFA profile (archived 31 May 2008)
RSSSF archive of results 1921–2003
RSSSF archive of most capped players and highest goalscorers
RSSSF archive of coaches 1921–
Full reports of all matches of the Portugal National Football Team 1921–1979

 
European national association football teams
UEFA European Championship-winning countries
UEFA Nations League-winning countries